Stauskas is a Lithuanian surname.  Notable people with the surname include:

Juan Carlos Stauskas (born 1939), Argentine footballer
Nik Stauskas (born 1993), Canadian basketball player in the National Basketball Association

Lithuanian-language surnames